Klungkung Regency is the smallest regency (kabupaten) on Bali, Indonesia. It has an area of 315 km2 and had a population at the 2010 Census of 170,543 which increased to 206,925 at the Census of 2020. The administrative centre for the regency (and for Klungkung District within the regency) is in the town of Semarapura.

Semarapura town is easily reached from Gianyar via the highway. The regency is famous for its classic Balinese paintings which mostly depict the story of epics such as Mahabharata or Ramayana. These classical style paintings come from the frescoes of the Balinese palaces, and can also be found at Klungkung Palace in the downtown area. Semarajaya Museum is also located in the area.

Some 64.4% of the land area of Klungkung is made of the offshore islands of Nusa Penida, Nusa Ceningan, Nusa Lembongan and eleven smaller islands, which together form Nusa Penida District, of which the town of Sampalan is the administrative centre; the other three districts lie on the island of Bali itself, in its southeast corner.

Administrative Districts
The regency is divided into four districts (kecamatan), listed below with their areas and their populations at the 2010 Census and the 2020 Census and the population density in 2020. The table also includes the number of administrative villages (rural desa and urban kelurahan) in each district, and its postal codes.

References

External links